American portrait may refer to:

 American Portraits, US radio series
 An American Portrait, US television series

See also
 Portrait (disambiguation)